This article contains information about the literary events and publications of 2000.

Events
February – El Ateneo Grand Splendid bookstore takes over the Teatro Gran Splendid in Buenos Aires, converting it for use as retail space.
February 13 – The final original Peanuts comic strip is published.
March 14 – Stephen King's novella Riding the Bullet is published in e-book format only, as the world's first mass-market electronic book.
September 26 – English politician and writer Jeffrey Archer is charged with perjury, and on the same day opens in the title role of his own courtroom drama, The Accused.
December 15 – In a landmark censorship case, Little Sisters Book and Art Emporium v. Canada (Minister of Justice), the Supreme Court of Canada rules that Canada Customs has no authority to make judgments on the permissibility of material being shipped to retailers, only to confiscate material specifically ruled by the courts to constitute an offence under the Canadian Criminal Code.

New books

Fiction
Reed Arvin – The Will
Margaret Atwood – The Blind Assassin
Louis Auchincloss – Her Infinite Variety
Trezza Azzopardi – The Hiding Place
Iain M. Banks – Look to Windward
Russell Banks – The Angel on the Roof
Matt Beaumont – e
Raymond Benson – Doubleshot
Xurxo Borrazás – Na maleta
Ben Bova – Jupiter
T. C. Boyle – A Friend of the Earth
Dan Brown – Angels & Demons
Jim Butcher – Storm Front
Peter Carey – True History of the Kelly Gang
Michael Chabon – The Amazing Adventures of Kavalier & Clay: A Novel
Tom Clancy – The Bear and the Dragon
Mary Higgins Clark and Carol Higgins Clark – Deck The Halls
Miriam Cooke – Hayati, My Life
Bernard Cornwell – Harlequin (also The Archer's Tale)
Patricia Cornwell – The Last Precinct
Mark Z. Danielewski – House of Leaves
August Derleth – The Original Text Solar Pons Omnibus Edition
K. Sello Duiker – Thirteen Cents
Ken Follett – Code to Zero
Jon Fosse – Morning and Evening
David S. Garnett – Bikini Planet
Amitav Ghosh – The Glass Palace
Myla Goldberg – Bee Season
Linda Grant – When I Lived in Modern Times
John Grisham – The Brethren
Mohsin Hamid – Moth Smoke
Joanne Harris – Blackberry Wine
Elisabeth Harvor – Excessive Joy Injures the Heart
Joseph Heller – Portrait of an Artist, as an Old Man
Kazuo Ishiguro – When We Were Orphans
Elfriede Jelinek – Greed
Robert Jordan – Winter's Heart
Barbara Kingsolver – Prodigal Summer
Sophie Kinsella – The Secret Dreamworld of a Shopaholic
Andrus Kivirähk – Rehepapp ehk November (Old Barny or November)
Joe R. Lansdale
The Bottoms
The Big Blow
Robert Ludlum – The Prometheus Deception
Tim LaHaye and Jerry B. Jenkins
The Indwelling
The Mark
Colleen McCullough – Morgan's Run
Alistair MacLeod – Island
Barry N. Malzberg – In the Stone House
Juliet Marillier – Son of the Shadows
George R. R. Martin – A Storm of Swords
Zakes Mda – The Heart of Redness
Mikael Niemi – Popular Music from Vittula (Populärmusik från Vittula)
Joyce Carol Oates – Blonde
Kenzaburō Ōe (大江 健三郎) – The Changeling (取り替え子 (チェンジリング, Torikae ko [Chenjiringu])
Daniel Olivas – The Courtship of María Rivera Peña
Robert B. Parker – Hugger Mugger
James Patterson – Roses are Red
Rosamunde Pilcher – Winter Solstice
Giuseppe Pontiggia – Nati due volte (Born Twice)
Terry Pratchett – The Truth
Mario Puzo – Omertà
Jean Raspail – Le Roi au-delà de la mer
Kathy Reichs – Deadly Decisions
Philip Roth – The Human Stain
Peter Ruber editor – Arkham's Masters of Horror
Marjane Satrapi – Persepolis (graphic novel, first part)
Jean-Jacques Schuhl – Ingrid Caven
Christina Schwarz – Drowning Ruth
Helen Simpson – Hey Yeah Right Get A Life
Michael Slade – Hangman
Gillian Slovo – Red Dust
Zadie Smith – White Teeth
Muriel Spark – Aiding and Abetting
Michael Stackpole
Dark Tide: Onslaught
Dark Tide: Ruin
Domenico Starnone – Via Gemito
Danielle Steel
 The House On Hope Street
 Journey
Kathy Tyers – Balance Point
Andrew Vachss – Dead and Gone
Mario Vargas Llosa – The Feast of the Goat (La fiesta del chivo)
Chris Ware – Jimmy Corrigan, the Smartest Kid on Earth (graphic novel)
Edmund White – The Married Man

Children and young people
Lloyd Alexander – The Cat Who Wished to Be a Man
David Almond – Counting Stars
Margaret Beames – Oliver in the Garden
Kirsten Boie – Wir Kinder aus dem Möwenweg (first in the Kinder aus dem Möwenweg series)
Lauren Child
Beware of the Storybook Wolves
I Will Never Not Ever Eat a Tomato
Deborah Ellis – The Breadwinner (also Parvana, first in the Breadwinner series of four books)
Mem Fox – Harriet, You'll Drive Me Wild!
Cornelia Funke – The Thief Lord
Jamila Gavin – Coram Boy
Anthony Horowitz – Stormbreaker
Hwang Sun-mi – The Hen Who Dreamed She Could Fly (마당을 나온 암탉, Sakyejul)
Shirley Isherwood – Flora the Frog
Jim Murphy – BLIZZARD! The Storm That Changed America
Beverley Naidoo – The Other Side of Truth
Jerry Pinkney – Aesop's Fables
Philip Pullman – The Amber Spyglass
J. K. Rowling – Harry Potter and the Goblet of Fire
Lemony Snicket
The Wide Window
The Miserable Mill
The Austere Academy
Jacqueline Wilson – Vicky Angel

Drama
David Auburn – Proof
Timothy Findley – Elizabeth Rex
Tanika Gupta – The Waiting Room
Dusty Hughes – Helpless
Joe Penhall – Blue/Orange

Poetry

Anne Carson – Men in the Off Hours
Paul Celan – Glottal Stop: 101 Poems by Paul Celan (translated by Heather McHugh and Nikolai Popov)
Fanny Howe – Fanny Howe: Selected Poems
Pierre Labrie – À tout hasard
Grazyna Miller – Sull'onda del respiro (On the Wave of Breath)
Owen Sheers – The Blue Book
Dejan Stojanović
Znak i njegova deca (The Sign and Its Children)
Oblik (The Shape)
Tvoritelj (The Creator)
Krugovanje (Circling), 3rd ed.

Non-fiction
Peter Ackroyd – London: A Biography
Martin Amis – Experience
The Beatles Anthology
Mark Buchanan – Ubiquity: The Science of History
Michael Burleigh – The Third Reich: A New History
Christian Cannuyer – Coptic Egypt: The Christians of the Nile
John Colapinto – As Nature Made Him: The Boy Who Was Raised as a Girl
Mary Craig – Blessings
Gerina Dunwich – Your Magickal Cat: Feline Magick, Lore, and Worship
Dave Eggers – A Heartbreaking Work of Staggering Genius
Charles Foster – Stardust and Shadows: Canadians in Early Hollywood
John Bellamy Foster – Marx's Ecology
Aileen Fox – Aileen: a Pioneering Archaeologist (autobiography)
Malcolm Gladwell – The Tipping Point: How Little Things Can Make a Big Difference
Lynda Gratton – Living Strategy: Putting People at the Heart of Corporate Purpose
Taras Grescoe – Sacré Blues
Christina Hoff Sommers – The War Against Boys: How Misguided Feminism Is Harming Our Young Men
Will Hutton – The World We're In
Stephen King – On Writing: A Memoir of the Craft
Lawrence Lessig – Code and Other Laws of Cyberspace
Roger Lowenstein – When Genius Failed: The Rise and Fall of Long-Term Capital Management
Sidney Poitier – The Measure of a Man: A Spiritual Autobiography
Arun Shourie – Harvesting Our Souls
Paul H. Ray – The Cultural Creatives: How 50 Million People Are Changing the World
Lorna Sage – Bad Blood
Diane Stanley – Michelangelo
Patrick Tort – Darwin and the Science of Evolution
Peter Ward and Donald Brownlee – Rare Earth: Why Complex Life is Uncommon in the Universe
Michael White – Leonardo: the First Scientist
Bruce Wilkinson – The Prayer of Jabez: Breaking Through to the Blessed Life

Deaths
January 2 – Patrick O'Brian (Richard Patrick Russ), English historical novelist (born 1914)
January 26
Kathleen Hale, English children's author and illustrator (born 1898)
A. E. van Vogt, Canadian-American science fiction author (born 1912)
January 31 – Gil Kane, Latvian-American comic book cartoonist (born 1926)
February 11 – Bernardino Zapponi, Italian novelist (born 1927)
February 12 – Charles M. Schulz, American cartoonist (born 1922)
March 28 – Anthony Powell, English novelist (born 1905)
 April 3 – Terence McKenna, American ethnobotanist, writer and public speaker (born 1946)
April 13 – Giorgio Bassani, Italian writer (born 1916)
April 15 – Edward Gorey, American illustrator and writer (born 1925)
April 21 – Al Purdy, Canadian poet (born 1918)
April 28 – Penelope Fitzgerald, English novelist, poet and biographer (born 1916)
May 13 – Paul Bartel, American actor, writer and director (born 1938)
May 16 – Andrzej Szczypiorski, Polish writer (born 1924)
May 21 – Dame Barbara Cartland, English novelist and playwright (born 1901)
July 14 – William Roscoe Estep, American historian and educator (born 1920)
August 3 – Michael Meyer, English translator and biographer (born 1921)
August 25 – Carl Barks, American comic book cartoonist (born 1901)
September 2 – Curt Siodmak, American novelist and screenwriter (born 1902)
September 3 – Jack Simmons, English historian (born 1915)
Oldřich Daněk, Czech dramatist (born 1927)
September 7 – Sir Malcolm Bradbury, English novelist and critic (born 1932)
September 14 – Hwang Sun-won, Korean fiction writer (born 1915)
September 22 – Yehuda Amichai, Israeli Hebrew-language poet (born 1924)
September 25 – R. S. Thomas, Welsh poet (born 1913)
October 8 – Charlotte Lamb (Sheila Holland, Sheila Coates, etc.), English romantic novelist (born 1937)
October 30 – Steve Allen, American writer, television presenter and songwriter (born 1921)
November 2 – Robert Cormier, American young adult fiction writer (born 1925)
November 6 – L. Sprague de Camp, American sci-fi, fantasy and science writer (born 1907)
December 3 – Gwendolyn Brooks, African-American poet (born 1917)

Awards
Nobel Prize for Literature: Gao Xingjian
Camões Prize: Autran Dourado

Australia
The Australian/Vogel Literary Award: Stephen Gray, The Artist is a Thief
C. J. Dennis Prize for Poetry: John Millett, Iceman
Kenneth Slessor Prize for Poetry: Jennifer Maiden, Mines
Mary Gilmore Prize: Lucy Dougan, Memory Shell
Miles Franklin Award: Tie: Thea Astley, Drylands; Kim Scott, Benang

Canada
Giller Prize for Canadian Fiction: Michael Ondaatje, Anil's Ghost – tied with: David Adams Richards, Mercy Among the Children
See 2000 Governor General's Awards for a complete list of winners and finalists for those awards.
Edna Staebler Award for Creative Non-Fiction: Wayson Choy, Paper Shadows

France
Prix Femina: Camille Laurens, Dans ces bras-là
Prix Goncourt: Jean-Jacques Schuhl, Ingrid Caven
Prix Décembre: Anthony Palou, Camille
Prix Médicis French: Armelle Lebras-Chopard, Le zoo des philosophes
Prix Médicis Non-Fiction: Yann Apperry, Diabolus in musica
Prix Médicis International: Michael Ondaatje, Anil's Ghost

Serbia
Rastko Petrović Award: Dejan Stojanović, Conversations ("Razgovori")

United Kingdom
Bollinger Everyman Wodehouse Prize for comic literature (first award): Howard Jacobson, The Mighty Walzer
Booker Prize: Margaret Atwood, The Blind Assassin
Caine Prize for African Writing: Leila Aboulela, "The Museum"
Carnegie Medal for children's literature: Beverley Naidoo, The Other Side of Truth
James Tait Black Memorial Prize for fiction: Zadie Smith, White Teeth
James Tait Black Memorial Prize for biography: Martin Amis, Experience
Cholmondeley Award: Alistair Elliot, Michael Hamburger, Adrian Henri, Carole Satyamurti
Eric Gregory Award: Eleanor Margolies, Antony Rowland, Antony Dunn, Karen Goodwin, Clare Pollard
Orange Prize for Fiction: Linda Grant, When I Lived in Modern Times
Samuel Johnson Prize: David Cairns, Berlioz: Volume 2
Queen's Gold Medal for Poetry: Edwin Morgan
Whitbread Best Book Award: Matthew Kneale, English Passengers

United States
Agnes Lynch Starrett Poetry Prize: Quan Barry, Asylum
Aiken Taylor Award for Modern American Poetry: Eleanor Ross Taylor
Bernard F. Connors Prize for Poetry: Corey Marks, "Renunciation", and (separately) Christopher Patton, "Broken Ground"
Bobbitt National Prize for Poetry: David Ferry, Of No Country I Know: New and Selected Poems and Translations
Brittingham Prize in Poetry: Greg Rappleye, A Path Between Houses
Business Week Best Book of the Year: Roger Lowenstein, When Genius Failed
Compton Crook Award: Stephen L. Burns, Flesh and Silver
Edgar Award: Joe R. Lansdale, The Bottoms
Frost Medal: Anthony Hecht
Hugo Award: Vernor Vinge, A Deepness in the Sky
Michael L. Printz Award for the "best book written for teens" (first award): Walter Dean Myers, Monster
National Book Award for Fiction: Susan Sontag, In America
National Book Critics Circle Award: Ted Conover, Newjack: Guarding Sing Sing
Nebula Award: Greg Bear, Darwin's Radio
Newbery Medal for children's literature: Christopher Paul Curtis, Bud, Not Buddy
PEN/Faulkner Award for Fiction: Ha Jin, Waiting
Pulitzer Prize for Drama: Donald Margulies, Dinner With Friends
Pulitzer Prize for Fiction: Jhumpa Lahiri, Interpreter of Maladies
Pulitzer Prize for Poetry: C.K. Williams, Repair
Wallace Stevens Award: Frank Bidart
Whiting Awards:
Fiction: Robert Cohen, Samantha Gillison, Lily King, John McManus, Colson Whitehead
Nonfiction: Andrew X. Pham
Plays: Kelly Stuart
Poetry: Albert Mobilio (poetry/fiction), James Thomas Stevens, Claude Wilkinson

Other
Finlandia Prize: Johanna Sinisalo Not Before Sunset (Ennen päivänlaskua ei voi)
International Dublin Literary Award: Nicola Barker, Wide Open
Premio Nadal: Lorenzo Silva, El alquimista impaciente
Viareggio Prize: Giorgio van Straten, Il mio nome a memoria and Sandro Veronesi, La forza del passato

Notes

References

 
Literature
Years of the 20th century in literature